Michel Jean is a Canadian television journalist and author. He is currently the weekend anchor of TVA Nouvelles on TVA, and was formerly an anchor on TVA's newsmagazine JE and for the 24-hour news channel RDI.

In addition to his journalism career, Jean has published several novels, including Envoyé spécial (2008), Un monde mort comme la lune (2009), Une vie à aimer (2010), Elle et nous (2012), Le vent en parle encore (2013), La belle mélancolie (2015), Tsunamis (2017),  Kukum (2019), and Tiohtiá:ke (2021).

Kukum, a novel based on the life of his own Innu great-grandmother Almanda Siméon, won the Prix France-Québec in 2020, and was selected for the 2021 edition of Le Combat des livres, where it was defended by indigenous activist and now Senator Michèle Audette. The novel won the competition on May 7, 2021. Following his success with Kukum, his earlier novel Elle et nous was reissued in 2021 under the new title Atuk.

References

External links
 Michel Jean

21st-century Canadian journalists
21st-century Canadian novelists
21st-century Canadian male writers
21st-century First Nations writers
Canadian television news anchors
Canadian male novelists
Canadian novelists in French
French Quebecers
First Nations novelists
Innu people
Living people
First Nations journalists
Journalists from Quebec
Writers from Quebec
Year of birth missing (living people)